Sir George Clerk of Pennycuik, 6th Baronet  (19 November 1787 – 23 December 1867) was a Scottish politician who served as the Tory MP for Edinburghshire, Stamford and Dover.

Background

Clerk was the son of Cpt. James Clerk (d.1793), third son of Sir George Clerk-Maxwell, 4th Baronet and Janet Irving. He was born near Edinburgh. He studied at the High School in Edinburgh and then went to the University of Oxford, graduating DCL in 1810.

Political career
Clerk sat as Member of Parliament for Edinburghshire from 1811 to 1832 and again from 1835 to 1837, for Stamford from 1838 to 1847 and then for Dover from 1847 to 1852. He served as one of the Commissioners of Weights and Measures from 1818 to 1821. He held political office as a Lord of the Admiralty from 1819 to 1830 (from 1827 to 1828 he was a member of the Council of the Lord High Admiral (The Duke of Clarence), as Under-Secretary of State for the Home Department from 5 August to 22 November 1830, as Parliamentary Secretary to the Treasury from November 1834 to April 1835, as Financial Secretary to the Treasury from September 1841 to February 1845. In 1845 he was sworn of the Privy Council and appointed Vice-President of the Board of Trade and Master of the Mint, posts he held until the fall of the Tory administration in 1846. He was also a Deputy Lieutenant for Edinburghshire.

Other positions of note
President of the Zoological Society 1862-1867
Chairman of the Royal Academy of Music

Later life and death

In 1812 he was elected a Fellow of the Royal Society of Edinburgh, his proposers being Thomas Charles Hope, Sir George Stewart MacKenzie and John Playfair. He was elected a Fellow of the Royal Society of London in 1819.

Clerk died in December 1867, aged 80, at Penycuik House, Midlothian. He is buried in the local churchyard, close to his parents' mausoleum in St. Mungo's Churchyard in Penicuik. His wife lies with him.

Family
Clerk married Maria Anne Law (1788-1866), the daughter of Ewan Law , brother of Edward Law, 1st Baron Ellenborough, in 1810.

His brother John Clerk-Maxwell of Middlebie, advocate, was father of the mathematical physicist James Clerk-Maxwell. His sister Isabella married the sometime Solicitor General for Scotland, James Wedderburn (1782–1822) of the Wedderburn baronets.

References

 Anderson, William, The Scottish Nation, Edinburgh, 1867, vol.iii, p. 652.

External links 
 

1787 births
1867 deaths
People educated at the Royal High School, Edinburgh
Conservative Party (UK) MPs for English constituencies
Members of the Parliament of the United Kingdom for Scottish constituencies
Baronets in the Baronetage of Nova Scotia
Lords of the Admiralty
Masters of the Mint
Members of the Privy Council of the United Kingdom
UK MPs 1807–1812
UK MPs 1812–1818
UK MPs 1818–1820
UK MPs 1820–1826
UK MPs 1826–1830
UK MPs 1830–1831
UK MPs 1831–1832
UK MPs 1835–1837
UK MPs 1837–1841
UK MPs 1841–1847
UK MPs 1847–1852
Presidents of the Zoological Society of London
Fellows of the Royal Society
Fellows of the Royal Society of Edinburgh
Members of the Parliament of the United Kingdom for Dover
Scottish Tory MPs (pre-1912)